The Diego Rivera Learning Complex (DRLC) is a high school in Los Angeles. It is a part of the Los Angeles Unified School District. It was formerly known as South Region High School No. 2. It is named after the artist Diego Rivera, and consists of four small schools: Public Service Community School, Communication  and Technology (CATS), Green Design, and Performing Arts.

When the school opened in 2011, it relieved Fremont High School and David Starr Jordan High School.

History 
Diego Rivera opened in 2011, reducing a high percentage of students who attended Fremont High school, whom switched to Diego Rivera Learning Complex.

References

External links
 Diego Rivera Learning Complex
 "LAUSD South Region New High School No. 2." McCarthy Building Companies, Inc.
 Fremont Zone of Choice

High schools in Los Angeles
Los Angeles Unified School District schools
2011 establishments in California
Educational institutions established in 2011